Lengthens FC are a football club who play in the Zimbabwe Premier Soccer League.

Performance in CAF competitions
CAF Confederation Cup: 1 appearance
2010 – First Round

Association football clubs established in 2002
Football clubs in Zimbabwe
2002 establishments in Zimbabwe